Søren Mussmann (born 29 June 1993) is a retired Danish professional football defender.

Retirement and later career
Mussmann retired on 17 January 2017 at the age of 23, due to several hip operations.

However, in April 2019, Mussmann signed with Denmark Series 4 amateur club TIF All Stars.

References

External links
Official Danish Superliga stats

1993 births
Living people
Danish men's footballers
SønderjyskE Fodbold players
Serie B players
Danish Superliga players
People from Haderslev Municipality
Association football defenders
Sportspeople from the Region of Southern Denmark